Synoicum adareanum is a species of sea squirt that inhabits the Antarctic sea floor around the Anvers Island archipelago. Within the species, a bacterium has been identified that is a member of a new and previously unstudied genus, Candidatus Synoicihabitans palmerolidicus.

Reference 

Aplousobranchia